Atsina refers to the Gros Ventre people.  It may also mean:

 Atsina Lake, a lake in Montana
 The Hidatsa tribe, doesn't mean "Gros Ventres of Missouri"
 Atsina (dance), a traditional dance from Togo